St Peter's Church, Edensor, is a Grade I listed church in Edensor, Derbyshire. St Peter's is the closest parish church in the Church of England to Chatsworth House, home of the Dukes of Devonshire, most of whom are buried in the churchyard. St Peter's is in a joint parish with St Anne's Church, Beeley.

The historic listing summary for the church states that it was built in the 12th century, modified in the 15th and "rebuilt in 1867 by Sir George Gilbert Scott".

Church

History
The original village of Edensor was located immediately next to Chatsworth House, but between 1838 and 1842 the 6th Duke of Devonshire had it demolished so it would be out of sight over a hill. The planning of the new village and the parish church was overseen by Joseph Paxton. The church was built for the 7th Duke of Devonshire. Consecrated in 1870, St Peter's comprises a west steeple, nave with aisles, chancel, north vestry and south east chapel.

A 2020 report states that the current church with its 166 feet-high spire, designed by George Gilbert Scott, was not built until about 25 years after the village was completed. It was a "replacement for the original squat-towered church that had occupied the site previously". Derbyshire Council states that "Edensor Church was taken down and rebuilt in 1867, incorporating some of the old Norman" church. Another source specifies that "very little remains of the Norman church".

The Council's research indicates that "the remains of two piscinas have been preserved" but does not state whether they are from the Norman era. Two features may be from that earlier church: "The nave is separated from the aisles by four pointed arches on each side, four of which belonged to the old church. The porch also, with some restoration, is a remnant of that edifice".

Memorials
 The Cavendish Memorial, a magnificent early-17th-century church monument to Henry (died 1616) and William (died 1625), commemorates the sons of Sir William Cavendish and Bess of Hardwick. William (died 1625) was the 1st Earl of Devonshire.
 The Barker family memorial commemorates a family member who fought aboard HMS Swiftsure in the Battle of Trafalgar.
 Grave of Kathleen Cavendish, Marchioness of Hartington (née Kennedy, 1920–1948). Her grave is marked with a headstone and a plaque in the ground commemorating the visit on July 29, 1963 of U.S. President John F. Kennedy to the gravesite. 
 Tablet to Andrew Cavendish, 11th Duke of Devonshire (d. 2004), erected to commemorate his jubilee.

Stained glass

Organ
The pipe organ was built by Bishop and Son and dates from 1873. A specification of the organ can be found on the National Pipe Organ Register.

Organists
Richard Sedding ca. 1853
Miss Forrester ca. 1870
Albert Ernest Wragg 1879 - 1929 (previously organist of Stannington Church)
T.H. Mosley 1929 - 1932 (afterwards organist of All Saints' Church, Bakewell, Derbyshire)
Herbert Pilkington 1932 - 1942 (formerly organist of Beeley Wesleyan Methodist Church)
A. Morrey 1942 - ???? (formerly organist of Christ Church, Normacot)

Churchyard
Sir Joseph Paxton (d. 1865) is buried in St Peter's churchyard, as are most Dukes of Devonshire and their families, including U.S. President John F. Kennedy's sister Kathleen, who was married to the 10th Duke's eldest son. Kennedy visited the grave during his presidency. Members of the Cavendish family buried here include:
 William Cavendish, 6th Duke of Devonshire (1790–1858), founder of modern-day Edensor
 Lord Frederick Charles Cavendish (1836–1882)
 Lucy Caroline, Lady Frederick Cavendish (1841–1925) 
 William Cavendish, 7th Duke of Devonshire (1808–1891)
 Spencer Cavendish, 8th Duke of Devonshire (1833–1908)
 Victor Cavendish, 9th Duke of Devonshire (1868–1938)
 Edward Cavendish, 10th Duke of Devonshire (1895–1950)
 Andrew Cavendish, 11th Duke of Devonshire (1920–2004)
 Deborah Cavendish, Duchess of Devonshire (1920–2014)

Their graves can be found on the highest spot of the churchyard in the Cavendish family plot.

The churchyard also contains three Commonwealth service war graves of World War I: a British soldier, a British sailor and a Canadian Army officer.

See also
Grade I listed churches in Derbyshire
Grade I listed buildings in Derbyshire
Listed buildings in Edensor

References

Church of England church buildings in Derbyshire
Grade I listed churches in Derbyshire
Churches completed in 1867